Colaspis suilla is a species of leaf beetle. It is found in North America.

References

Further reading

 

Eumolpinae
Articles created by Qbugbot
Beetles described in 1801
Taxa named by Johan Christian Fabricius
Beetles of North America